The waterfalls in Andhra Pradesh of India are formed by the waters of the tributaries of the Godavari, Krishna and Nagavali rivers.

References
Leela waterfalls : https://www.youtube.com/watch?v=_ZZIOssERYI&t=353s
Thonam waterfalls: https://www.youtube.com/watch?v=xgch9W1d-CA
Salugu and Kudiki waterfalls : https://www.youtube.com/watch?v=OMaCZ183dIQ&t=109s

 
A
W